Quebec train crash may refer to:

 St-Hilaire train disaster, 1864 — train fell through bridge into river
 Dorion level crossing accident, 1966 — school bus hit by freight train
 Lac-Mégantic derailment, 2013 —runaway  oil train exploded